The 1980 Country Music Association Awards, 14th Ceremony, was held on October 13, 1980, at the Grand Ole Opry House, Nashville, Tennessee, and was hosted by CMA Award winners Mac Davis and Barbara Mandrell.

Winners and nominees 
Winners in Bold.

Hall of Fame

References 

Country Music Association Awards
Country Music Association Awards
CMA
Country Music Association Awards
Country Music Association Awards
Country Music Association Awards
20th century in Nashville, Tennessee
Events in Nashville, Tennessee